Ray Beckerman is an attorney in New York City, practicing law at Ray Beckerman, P.C. He is noted for his analysis and commentary on the RIAA's campaign, commenced in 2003, of copyright infringement lawsuits against individuals engaged unauthorized peer-to-peer file sharing of music.

Beckerman was admitted to the bar on January 17, 1979, and has served primarily as a commercial litigation attorney, but also practiced internet law, business law, copyright, trademark, and entertainment law.

In addition to his legal work, he writes several blogs: "Ohio Election Fraud" (formerly "Fairness"), which deals with the 2004 presidential litigation in the state of Ohio, "Recording Industry vs. The People", which chronicles the above-mentioned lawsuits between RIAA labels and individual defendants, "Ray's 2.0", about social media, and "Fairness", which deals with issues of social justice and human rights.

He is a member of the Electronic Frontier Foundation. A member of the Entertainment Law Committee of the Association of the Bar of the City of New York, he has previously served on that body's Copyright Law, Information Technology Law, and Civil Court committees. He is well known in the Slashdot internet community, where he posts under the username "NewYorkCountryLawyer" and in the Twitter community under the username "raybeckerman".

References

External links
  Ray Beckerman at Recording Industry vs The People

New York (state) lawyers
Living people
Year of birth missing (living people)